Roman Jebavý and Igor Zelenay were the defending champions but only Jebavý chose to defend his title, partnering Adam Pavlásek. Jebavý lost in the final to Neil Oberleitner and Philipp Oswald.

Oberleitner and Oswald won the title after defeating Jebavý and Pavlásek 7–6(7–5), 6–2 in the final.

Seeds

Draw

References

External links
 Main draw

Svijany Open - Doubles
2022 Doubles